Rodrigue Neti (born 28 April 1995) is a French rugby union player. His position is in the prop and he currently plays for Toulouse in the Top 14.

References

External links
Toulouse profile
L'Équipe profile

1995 births
Living people
People from Nouméa
French people of New Caledonian descent
French rugby union players
Stade Toulousain players
France international rugby union players
Rugby union props
New Caledonian rugby union players